The Fazaouro Formation is a fluvial-lacustrine sedimentary fill in the northeast of the Province of Lugo, at the site of the prehistoric depositional ranges of a supposed sedimentary glaciation. The area consists of a valley and ridge topography, with a series of small mounts at roughly ninety degrees to each other. The Fazaouro Formation develops through the extinct and extant current basins that fill the valley of Valadouro & Foz.

References 

Geologic formations of Spain

Coal formations
Coal in Spain

Geography of Galicia (Spain)